Mount Sibulan is an inactive volcano located in Santa Cruz, Davao del Sur near a resort called Forest Hill Resort in the province of Region XI. It is located within Mount Apo Natural Park.

References

External links 
 

Mountains of the Philippines
Landforms of Davao del Sur
Inactive volcanoes of the Philippines